The following ferries once crossed the North River (Hudson River) between New York City and New Jersey. There was no ferry service between 1967 and 1989, when it was restarted by New York Waterway.

Row and Sail

Horse ferries 
Team boats served New York City for "about ten years, from 1814-1824. They were of eight horse-power and crossed the rivers in from twelve to twenty minutes."

In 1812, two steam boats designed by Robert Fulton were placed in use in New York, for the Paulus Hook Ferry from the foot of Cortlandt Street, and on the Hoboken Ferry from the foot of Barclay Street. The Juliana, running from Barclay Street, was withdrawn from service, as announced, in favor of the "more convenient" horse boat. It is almost certain, however, that this retrograde step was taken because of the monopoly enjoyed by Mssrs. Fulton and Livingston for the navigation of the waters of New York State by steam.

Steam

See also
List of ferries across the East River
List of fixed crossings of the Hudson River
List of fixed crossings of the East River
New York New Jersey Rail car float, Brooklyn to Jersey City
New York Harbor
Geography of New York Harbor
North River
Port of New York and New Jersey
Timeline of Jersey City area railroads
Perth Amboy Ferry Slip

References

Bibliography
 Brian J. Cudahy, Over and Back: The History of Ferryboats in New York Harbor
 Arthur G. Adams, The Hudson Through the Years

External links
 Hudson County Public Transportation 1926
 World Shipping
 A Compilation of the Ferry Leases and Railroad Grants Made by the Corporation of the City of New York, 1860
 A Compilation of the Existing Ferry Leases and Railroad Grants Made by the Corporation of the City of New York, 1866
 History of the Hudson River Ferries
 Brooklyn Eagle Alamanac describing available service
 Court case 1897 describing traffic
 Breakwater and Pavonia collision

Ferries
Ferry transportation in New York City
Ferry transportation in New Jersey
Transportation in Hudson County, New Jersey
Port of New York and New Jersey
Hudson
Hudson
Hudson River
New York City-related lists